Exeter Union High School is located in  Exeter, California, in Tulare County.

Academics
Exeter Union High School currently offers a curriculum that prepares its students for higher education, vocational training, and direct entry into the workforce. In 2009 it was declared a California Distinguished School.

Notable alumni
 Floyd Collier (1924–2002), professional football player
 Satoshi Hirayama (born 1931), professional baseball player
 Brad Mills (born 1957), professional baseball player, coach, and manager
 Adam Pettyjohn (born 1977), professional baseball player
 Jeriome Robertson (1977–2010), professional baseball player

References

High schools in Tulare County, California
High schools in California
1908 establishments in California